"I've Been Down That Road Before" is a talking blues song by Hank Williams. It was released by MGM Records under the name "Luke the Drifter", which was a pseudonym for Hank's recitations. It was another dose of the sage advice that Luke the Drifter seemed endlessly capable of dispensing - and Hank Williams seemed just as capable of ignoring. Biographer Colin Escott calls it "perhaps the most directly biographical song he ever wrote, and leaves us guessing at the incidents that inspired it." He recorded it in Nashville on June 1, 1951 with Fred Rose producing and backing by Jerry Rivers (fiddle), Don Helms (steel guitar), Sammy Pruett (electric guitar), Jack Shook (rhythm guitar), Ernire Newton or "Cedric Rainwater", aka Howard Watts (bass), and possibly Owen Bradley (organ).

References

Hank Williams songs
1951 songs
Songs about roads
Song recordings produced by Fred Rose (songwriter)
Songs written by Hank Williams
MGM Records singles